The 2010 NCAA Division I Women's Lacrosse Championship was the 29th annual single-elimination tournament to determine the national champion of Division I NCAA women's college lacrosse. The first two rounds of the tournament were played at the home fields of higher-seeded teams from May 15–22, and the semifinal and championship rounds were played at Johnny Unitas Stadium in Towson, Maryland from May 28–30. All NCAA Division I women's lacrosse programs were eligible for this championship, and a total of 16 teams were invited to participate.

Maryland defeated Northwestern, 13–11, to win their tenth national championship, and first since 2001. Maryland's win ended Northweastern's streak of five consecutive national titles (2005–09). Nonetheless, this would subsequently become the sixth of the Wildcats' eight consecutive appearances in the championship game (2005–12). 

The leading scorer for the tournament was Shannon Smith from Northwestern (20 goals). Caitlyn McFadden from Maryland was named the tournament's Most Outstanding Player.

Tournament field
A total of 16 teams were invited to participate. 9 teams qualified automatically by winning their conference tournaments while the remaining 7 teams qualified at-large based on their regular season records.

Play-in games

Seeds

1. Maryland (18-1)
2. Northwestern (17-1)
3. North Carolina (15-2)
4. Georgetown (13-5)
5. James Madison (16-2)
6. Virginia (13-5)
7. Duke (13-5)
8. Penn (14-3)

Teams

Tournament bracket 
{{4RoundBracket-Byes | RD1=First RoundCampus sitesMay 15–16 | RD2=QuarterfinalsCampus sitesMay 22 | | RD3=SemifinalsJohnny Unitas StadiumTowson, MDMay 28 | RD4=FinalsJohnny Unitas StadiumTowson, MDMay 30

| RD1-seed01  =1
| RD1-team01  = Maryland* 
| RD1-score01 =20
| RD1-seed02  =
| RD1-team02  = Marist 
| RD1-score02 =5

| RD1-seed03 =8
| RD1-team03  = Penn* 
| RD1-score03 =14
| RD1-seed04  =
| RD1-team04  = Boston U. 
| RD1-score04 =9

| RD1-seed05  =5| RD1-team05  =James Madison* 
| RD1-score05 =9| RD1-seed06  =
| RD1-team06  = Stanford 
| RD1-score06 = 8

| RD1-seed07  =4
| RD1-team07  =Georgetown*
| RD1-score07 =8
| RD1-seed08  =
| RD1-team08  =Syracuse| RD1-score08 = 15| RD1-seed09  =3| RD1-team09  =North Carolina*
| RD1-score09 =18| RD1-seed10  =
| RD1-team10  = Navy 
| RD1-score10 = 5

| RD1-seed11  =6| RD1-team11  =Virginia*  
| RD1-score11 =14| RD1-seed12  =
| RD1-team12  = Towson 
| RD1-score12 = 12

| RD1-seed13  =7| RD1-team13  =Duke* 
| RD1-score13 =16| RD1-seed14  =
| RD1-team14  = Vanderbilt
| RD1-score14 = 15

| RD1-seed15  =2| RD1-team15  = Northwestern*
| RD1-score15 =19| RD1-seed16  =
| RD1-team16  = Notre Dame
| RD1-score16 = 7

| RD2-seed01  =1| RD2-team01  =Maryland*
| RD2-score01 =15| RD2-seed02  =8
| RD2-team02  = Penn
| RD2-score02 = 10

| RD2-seed03  =5
| RD2-team03  = James Madison*
| RD2-score03 = 3
| RD2-seed04  =
| RD2-team04  = Syracuse| RD2-score04 = 7| RD2-seed05  =3| RD2-team05  = North Carolina*
| RD2-score05 = 17| RD2-seed06  =6
| RD2-team06  = Virginia
| RD2-score06 = 7

| RD2-seed07  =7
| RD2-team07  = Duke
| RD2-score07 = 8
| RD2-seed08  =2| RD2-team08  = Northwestern*
| RD2-score08 = 18| RD3-seed01  =1| RD3-team01  = Maryland| RD3-score01 = 14| RD3-seed02  =
| RD3-team02  = Syracuse
| RD3-score02 = 5

| RD3-seed03  =3
| RD3-team03  = North Carolina
| RD3-score03 = 10
| RD3-seed04  =2| RD3-team04  = Northwestern| RD3-score04 = 15| RD4-seed01  =1| RD4-team01  = Maryland| RD4-score01 = 13| RD4-seed02  =2
| RD4-team02  = Northwestern
| RD4-score02 = 11
}}
* Host institution

 All-tournament team 
Kari Ellen Johnson, MarylandCaitlyn McFadden, Maryland (Most outstanding player)'''
Sarah Mollison, Maryland
Katie Schwarzmann, Maryland
Karissa Taylor, Maryland
Corey Donohoe, North Carolina
Laura Zimmerman, North Carolina
Katrina Dowd, Northwestern
Shannon Smith, Northwestern
Danielle Spencer, Northwestern
Liz Hogan, Syracuse
Halley Quillinan, Syracuse

See also 
 NCAA Division II Women's Lacrosse Championship 
 NCAA Division III Women's Lacrosse Championship
 2010 NCAA Division I Men's Lacrosse Championship

References

NCAA Division I Women's Lacrosse Championship
NCAA Division I Women's Lacrosse Championship
NCAA Women's Lacrosse Championship